K. B. Sreedevi is a Malayalam language writer from Kerala, India. She made literary contributions in the fields of story, novel, study, children's literature and drama. Most of her works on Indian mythology and folklore comes under the genre children's literature. She received several awards including Kerala Sahitya Akademi Award for Overall Contributions and Kerala State Film Award for Story.

Her granddaughter Ranjana K. made her novel Yajnam to a forty five minute film with same title. Her story Shilpe-rupini was translated into English by Gita Krishnankutty as Woman of Stone (1990). When her work Niramala was made into a film, she done its screenplay also.

Biography
K. B. Sreedevi was born on May 1, 1940, in Vellakattumana in Vaniyambalam in present-day Malappuram district to V. M. C. Narayanan Bhattathippad and Gowri Antharjanam. She was educated at Tripunithura Girls' High School and Varavoor Government School. She studied up to tenth class. Sreedevi studied music and Sanskrit also. Later she done higher studies in Sanskrit under Panditharaja P. S. Subbarama Pattar. For three years she practiced Veena under Naravath Devakiamma.

Sreedevi wrote her first story at the age of thirteen, it was about the death of a bird. She has published many novels and short stories through publications like Ezhuthachan Masika, Jayakeralam and Mathrubhumi.

She married Brahmadathan Namboodiripad at the age of sixteen. while living with husband, in 1960 she found a Mahila Samajam (group of women). Formed for the upliftment of women and children, the group had more than 100 members. The group organized education classes to make women literate, cultural activities for woman, and job trainings to women. She was active with the group until she shifted to Thrissur.

Personal life
She and her husband Brahmadathan Namboodiripad of Koodalloor Mana have 3 children. She who lived in Thrissur for many years is now living in Tripunithura in Ernakulam district.

Notable works

Short story collection

 Krishnanuragam
 Common Wealth
 Chiranjivi
 Pattamula
 Pinneyum Padunna Kili

Screenplay 

 Niramala

Works on Indian mythology and folklore
 , stories based on Bhagavata Purana
 , Elaborated writing of Njanappana by Poonthanam
 
 
 
 
  
 
 
 
 
 
 
 
 
 
 Dasharatham
 Devahooti
 Vrathasuran
 Karinkali, Research novel on 'Karinkali', the farming goddess of the early adivasis of Ernad

Play 
 Kururamma

Studies
 Pracheena Gurukulangal Kerala Samskarathinu Nalkiya Sambhavana, study on contributions of ancient scholars to Kerala with  scholarship from Department of Human Resources, Government of India
 Study on woman writers of Kerala with grant in aid from Kerala Sahitya Akademi

Awards and honors
Kerala Sahitya Akademi Award for Overall Contributions
Kerala State Film Award 1975 for Story,  Niramala
Kumkumam Award 1974, for the novel Yajnam
Nalapadan Narayana Menon  Award for Moonnam Thalamura
VT Award.
Rotary Award 1982for Story,  Niramala
Deviprasadam Trust Award, 2009
Njanappana Award 2021, considering her comprehensive contributions to the field of literature over six decades
Raikva Rishi Award 2014
Amritakeerti Puraskar 2018

References

1940 births
Living people
Malayalam-language writers
Indian women novelists
Indian women short story writers
People from Malappuram district
Malayalam short story writers
Women writers from Kerala
21st-century Indian short story writers
21st-century Indian novelists
21st-century Indian women writers
21st-century Indian writers